Anton Yevgenyevich Petrov (born 8 August 1994) is a Russian football player.

Club career
He made his debut in the Russian Professional Football League for FC Znamya Truda Orekhovo-Zuyevo on 18 July 2018 in a game against FC Tekstilshchik Ivanovo.

References

External links
 Profile by Russian Professional Football League
 
 

1994 births
Living people
Russian footballers
Association football midfielders
FC Znamya Truda Orekhovo-Zuyevo players
People from Orekhovo-Zuyevo
Sportspeople from Moscow Oblast